Prakash Rameshwar Munda (born 7 November 1991, Ranchi, Jharkhand) is an Indian first-class cricketer who played for Jharkhand cricket team. He was a right-handed wicket-keeper batsman. He is a first tribal to play in Jharkhand cricket team.

References

External links
 
 

1991 births
Living people
Indian cricketers
People from Ranchi
Jharkhand cricketers
East Zone cricketers
Munda people
Cricketers from Bihar